Władysław Santarius (also known as Vladislav Santarius) (12 November 1915 in Stonava, Austrian Silesia – 5 June 1989 in Havířov, Czechoslovakia) was a Polish Lutheran Evangelical pastor, one of the most significant Christian leaders in Czechoslovakia during the Communist era. He was leader of revivalist movement in Cieszyn Silesia and because of it he was persecuted (but never jailed).

See also 
 Silesian Evangelical Church of Augsburg Confession

Bibliography 
 Lord, You Have Called… Vladislav Santarius – God’s Work Through His Life And Ministry. Český Těšín: 2004.
 Martin Piętak: Faith, Ethnicity and Social Issues in the Thoughts and Work of Pastor Vladislav Santarius. Journal of Lutheran Mission, 2015 (2), No. 5, pp. 52–61.

1915 births
1989 deaths
People from Karviná District
Polish people from Zaolzie
Polish evangelicals
Polish Lutheran clergy
Czech Lutheran clergy